Decanonization or de-canonization (prefix de-  ←   preposition: down, from, away +  ←  — list, catalog) — exclusion of a person's name from the list, catalog; the opposite of canonization. The list or catalog is the calendar of the saints or the church calendar. Decanonization, the exclusion of the saint's name from the calendars, was carried out in the Russian Orthodox Church, in the Catholic Church and in the Anglican Church. Exclusion from the calendars of saints can occur due to early erroneous canonization, or due to religious policy. Decanonization means that from this moment in time, the church authorities prohibit people from praying to the decanonized person, and they no longer consider the decanonized person as their intercessor to God and Heavenly patron.

Orthodox Church 
In the Russian Orthodox Church, the most famous case is the decanonization of the Right-Believing knyaginya of Anna of Kashin at the Great Moscow Synod in 1677—1678. The reason for the decanonization was the religious policy of the forcible introduction in Russia of three fingers instead of two fingers. The reforms that began under Alexis Mikhailovich and continued under Peter I and his followers demanded a political and ecclesiastical separation from the previous tradition and national culture. First of all, decanonization affected persons whose literary works or hagiographic works contradicted the new religious policy. The veneration of the famous ecclesiastical writer and translator, the Maximus the Greek, was suspended. Memorial days associated with 21 Russian saints have disappeared from the Typikon of 1682. In Peter's times, the veneration of the martyrs Anthony, John, and Eustathius, who wore beards, suffered from a clean-shaven pagan knyaz, was stopped. After 1721 the number of canonizations sharply decreased (only 2) and decanonizations began (there were, of course, much more than 8 of them). In the XVIII century there was a decanonization of a number of locally revered saints, and in the 19th century church veneration of many locally venerated saints was restored. Hegumen Andronik (Trubachev) believes that the most pernicious were not specific decanonizations, but the very admission of decanonization into church life as a possible norm, a rule implemented due to a change in church policy.

In the 20th century, some of the names of previously decanonized saints were returned to the church calendar. The re-canonization of Anna Kashinskaya took place in the Russian Church in 1909. However, most of the ancient Russian ascetics, whose veneration was terminated during the "struggle against Raskol", remained forgotten.

In 2013, 36 saints (New Martyrs who suffered from repression during the Soviet era) were decanonized. They were early canonized. Their names were removed from the 2013 Russian Orthodox Church calendar without explanation.

Catholic Church 

Though this did not constitute a "decanonization", on February 14, 1969, Pope Paul VI, through the apostolic letter Mysterii Paschalis, removed the names of a number of saints from the General Roman Calendar, based on the lack of documentary evidence of their lives. Among them: 
Telephorus, 5 January, added in 1602, deleted: the feast was originally that of an otherwise unknown martyr, who was not a pope; 
Hyginus, 11 January, added in the 12th century, deleted; not a martyr and the date of his death is unknown; 
Maris, Martha, Abachum and Audifax, 19 January, added in the 9th century, deleted: nothing is known of them other than their names and place of burial; 
Dorothy, 6 February, added in the 13th century, deleted: her acts are completely fabulous; 
Faustinus and Jovita, 15 February, added in the 13th century, deleted: their Acts are completely fabulous; 
Lucius I, 4 March, added in 1602, deleted: not a martyr; 
Forty Martyrs, 10 March, added in the 12th century, deleted: many questions have been raised about the veracity of their Acts; 
Anicetus, 17 April, added in the 12th century, deleted: not a martyr and his date of death is unknown; 
Soter and Caius, 22 April, added in the 13th century, deleted: not martyrs and the date of death of the former is unknown; 
Cletus and Marcellinus, 26 April, added in the 13th century, deleted: Cletus seems not to be a martyr; his date of death is unknown and that of Marcellinus is disputed; 
Boniface (Martyr), 14 May, deleted: the Passion of Saint Boniface of Tarsus is completely fabulous; 
Urban I, 25 May, deleted: this martyr was not in fact the pope; 
Eleutherius, 26 May, deleted: not a martyr and his date of burial is unknown; 
Felix I, 30 May, deleted: the martyr that ancient liturgical books celebrated on this day was not the pope; 
Basilides, Cyrinus, Nabor and Nazarius, 12 June, deleted: their Passion is completely fabulous; 
Seven Holy Brothers, 10 July, deleted: their Passion is completely fabulous, and the day was in reality dedicated to four distinct commemorations; 
Pius I, 11 July, deleted: not a martyr and his date of death is unknown; 
Alexius, 17 July, deleted: his Life is fabulous; 
Symphorosa and her seven sons, 18 July, deleted: their Acts are untrustworthy and are thought to be an imitation of the Passion of Saint Felicitas and Her Seven Sons; 
Margaret of Antioch, 20 July, deleted: the Acts of Saint Margaret or Marina are entirely fabulous; 
Victor I, 28 July, deleted: not a martyr and the date of his death is unknown; 
Zephyrinus, 26 August, deleted: not a martyr and his date of death is unknown; 
Twelve Holy Brothers, 1 September, deleted: their Acts are fabulous; these martyrs who suffered in different places in Lucania were not blood brothers;
Lucy and Geminianus, 16 September, deleted: duplicates the 13 December feast of Saint Lucy, while Geminianus appears to be merely fictitious; 
Eustace and Companions, 20 September, deleted: the Passion of Saint Eustace is completely fabulou; 
Linus, 23 September, deleted: his day of death is unknown and he seems not to be a martyr; 
Cyprian and Justina, 26 September, deleted: fictitious characters; 
Placid and Companions, 5 October, added in 1588, deleted: it is agreed that Saint Placidus, the disciple of Saint Benedict, is distinct from this unknown Sicilian martyr; 
Sergius, 8 October, deleted: devotion to him is not part of Roman tradition; 
Marcellus, 8 October, deleted: devotion to him is not part of Roman tradition; 
Bacchus and Apuleius, 8 October, deleted: the Life of each is completely fabulous; 
Ursula and Companions, 21 October, deleted: their Passion is completely fabulous; not even the names of the virgin saints killed at Cologne at an uncertain time are known; 
Tryphon, Respicius, and Nympha, 10 November, deleted: nothing is known of these martyrs, none of whom was of Rome;
Catherine, 25 November, deleted: the Passion of Saint Catherine is entirely fabulous and nothing certain can be stated about her; 
Barbara, 4 December, deleted: her Acts are completely fabulous and there is much disagreement among scholars about where she was martyred.

Pope Paul VI removed Simon of Trent from the Roman Martyrology in 1965. "Simon of Trent is not in the new Roman Martyrology of 2000, nor on any modern Catholic calendar.

Anglican Church 
On 16 Nov. 1538 Henry VIII issued a proclamation declaring that ’ all images and pictures of Thomas Becket were to be ‘put down,’ and all mention of him in calendar and service book to be erased.

In 1966, the Anglican Church excluded Little Saint Hugh of Lincoln from the books of locally revered saints.

Challenging the possibility of decanonization 
There is a group of people who consider the term "decanonization" to be incorrect, as a rule these are persons affiliated with religious structures. They believe that the saints still remain in Heaven. They reject the very possibility of decanonization. They regard canonization as an infallible act that cannot be corrected.

References

Canonization
Christian practices
Christian saints
Christian terminology
Posthumous recognitions